Marcellus Andrellious "Mardy" Scales (born September 10, 1981) is an American sprinter who specializes in the 100 metres.

He won a silver medal at the 2003 Pan American Games. He also competed in the 4×100 metres relay at the 2005 World Championships, but after a failed exchange the US team was disqualified.

His personal best time over 100 metres is 10.07 seconds, achieved in June 2004 in Austin. His personal best time over 60 metres is 6.59 seconds, achieved in February 2005 in Fayetteville. In the 200 metres, he has 20.62 seconds, achieved in August 2005 in Malmö.

References

External links
 

1981 births
Living people
People from Franklin, Tennessee
Track and field athletes from Tennessee
American male sprinters
Athletes (track and field) at the 2003 Pan American Games
Pan American Games medalists in athletics (track and field)
Pan American Games silver medalists for the United States
USA Indoor Track and Field Championships winners
Medalists at the 2003 Pan American Games